The Royal Scottish Forestry Society was founded in 1854 as the Scottish Arboricultural Society. In 1869, the society received the patronage of Queen Victoria and the "Royal" prefix was added in 1887. The name changed to the current one in 1930.

In addition to advising the forestry industry, the RSFS manages its own woodland, Cashel Forest at Cashel, near Milarrochy Bay on the east shore of Loch Lomond. The RSFS purchased the site in 1996 and since then has been establishing a native woodland to demonstrate best practice in woodland management and growing timber.

The RSFS publishes a journal, Scottish Forestry.

Among its past presidents was the Scottish botanist Dr. Hugh Cleghorn.

See also

The Royal Forestry Society of England, Wales and Northern Ireland

References

External links

1854 establishments in Scotland
19th century in Scotland
Forestry societies
Rural Scotland
Forestry
Science and technology in Scotland
Organizations established in 1854
Forestry in Scotland